Allure is an American women's magazine focused on beauty, published monthly by Condé Nast in New York City. It was founded in 1991 by Linda Wells. Michelle Lee replaced Wells in 2015. A signature of the magazine is its annual Best of Beauty awards—accolades given in the October issue to beauty products deemed the best by Allures staff.

History
In 1990, S.I. Newhouse Jr., chairman of Condé Nast, and then editorial director Alexander Liberman approached Linda Wells to develop a concept they had for a beauty magazine. At the time, Wells was the beauty editor and the food editor at The New York Times Magazine.

The magazine's prototype was shredded shortly before the scheduled launch date and, after overhauling everything (including the logo), Allure made its debut in March 1991  designed by Lucy Sisman. The magazine's original format was oversize, but this prevented it from fitting into slots at grocery-store checkouts and required advertisers to resize their ads or create new ones. After four issues, Allure changed to a standard-size glossy format.

On August 29, 2022 Conde Nast announced the December 2022 issue will be the last print issue of the magazine before transitioning to digital-only. Allure employees unionized in 2022. Conde states, “It’s our mission to meet the audience where they are and with this in mind, after our December print issue, we are making Allure an exclusively digital brand.”

Impact
Allure focuses on beauty, fashion, and women's health. Allure was the first women's magazine to write about the health risks associated with silicone breast implants, and has reported on other controversial health issues.

After Lee took the helm in late 2015, the brand was celebrated for promoting diversity and inclusivity. In 2017, Adweek named Allure Magazine of the Year and awarded Lee as Editor of the Year.

The magazine's circulation, initially 250,000 in 1991, is over 1 million as of 2011.

Many  writers have contributed to Allure. Among them are Arthur Miller, John Updike, Jhumpa Lahiri, Michael Chabon, Kathryn Harrison, Frank McCourt, Isabel Allende, and Francine du Plessix Gray. Elizabeth Gilbert’s essay “The Road to Rapture,” published in Allure in 2003, was the precursor to her 2006 memoir, Eat, Pray, Love (Viking Adult). Photographers who have shot for Allure include Michael Thompson, Mario Testino, Patrick Demarchelier, Norman Jean Roy, Tina Barney, Marilyn Minter, Carter Smith, Steven Klein, Steven Meisel, and Helmut Newton. Cover subjects have included Demi Lovato, Jennifer Aniston, Jennifer Lopez, Helen Mirren, Zendaya, Julia Roberts, Angelina Jolie, Reese Witherspoon, Mary-Kate and Ashley Olsen, Victoria Beckham, Beyoncé, Fergie, Britney Spears, Lupita Nyong'o, Jessica Simpson, Kate Hudson, Christina Aguilera, Ariana Grande, Rihanna, and Gwen Stefani.
(See List of Allure cover models).

Best of Beauty Awards
Allure began its Best of Beauty awards program in the mid-1990s, at the initiative of Wells, to help readers choose among the vast array of makeup, skin-care, and hair-care products on the market. In 2019, the magazine introduced the Allure Best of Beauty Clean Seal award to products that met the publication's "clean" standards.

Allure has two sets of awards, one judged by the magazine's editors and the other by readers. A "winners' seal" logo, developed by Allure, appears on many of the winning products. To ensure that its judgments are neutral, Allures ad department isn't involved in the selections.

In 2010, the magazine developed an iPhone app that highlights the winning products and tells users where they can buy them based on their location.

Controversy
The magazine faced online criticism when it showed Marissa Neitling with an Afro haircut.

Singer Halsey has announced she will no longer do press after Allure failed to use her correct pronouns in its August cover story and promoted the interview by allegedly taking quotes out of context.

Awards (for Allure)
Magazine of the Year from Adweek (2017)
Bronze Clio Award for Allure Unbound augmented reality app (2017)
The National Magazine Award for Design (1994)
The Editorial Excellence Award from Folio (2001)
The Circulation Excellence Award from Circulation Management (2001)
"Ring Leader", an essay by Natalie Kusz from the February 1996 issue of Allure, was selected for The Best American Essays 1997 (Houghton Mifflin).
The magazine has been on Adweek’s Hot List in 1993, 1994, 1995, 2003, and 2007.
Allure has received 29 awards from the American Academy of Dermatology, nine journalism awards from The Fragrance Foundation, and the Excellence in Media Award from the Skin Cancer Foundation.

Awards (for Linda Wells)
The Achiever Award from Cosmetic Executive Women (2001)
The Matrix Award for magazine leadership from New York Women in Communications, Inc. (2009)

Awards (for Michelle Lee)
Editor of the Year from Adweek (2017)
Digidays Glossy 50 (2017)
A100 Most Influential Asians from Gold House (2018)
Creative 100 from Create & Cultivate (2017)

In the media
Wells, along with Allure editors Michael Carl and Kelly Atterton, have appeared as judges on the Bravo TV series Shear Genius.

Allure editors have appeared as experts on television programs such as the Today show and 60 Minutes, and Allure stories frequently receive national attention.

Hilary Duff played an Allure intern in Cheaper by the Dozen 2.

See also
List of Allure cover models
 List of Allure Editor

References

Further reading
  Hilary Milnes, "Inside Allure's beauty box business", Glossy, May 14, 2018.
 Karen K. Ho, "In a rare move, Allure's cover features three Asian models", Columbia Journalism Review, May 21, 2018.
 Jamé Jackson, "Chatting with Michelle Lee, Editor in Chief of Allure", Ed 2010.
  Jason Fell, "Allure Floods Issue with 2-D Barcodes, Sees Subscription Bump", Folio, October 10, 2020.
 Jen Murphy, "Pedaling in Place on the Road to Fitness", The Wall Street Journal, September 14, 2010.
 2017 Best of Beauty Awards Revealed on Today
 Ani Mandara, "Allure Mag Selects Affordable, Awesome Products", ABC News, October 4, 2010.
 "In Depth: 2009's Most Powerful Fashion Magazine Editors", Forbes, September 7, 2009.
 Linda Wells, "Inside Allure: Letter From the Editor", Allure, November 2010.

External links
 
 
 Allure Staff Contact Information

1991 establishments in New York City
Monthly magazines published in the United States
2022 disestablishments in New York City
Condé Nast magazines
Magazines established in 1991
Magazines published in New York City
Women's fashion magazines
Defunct women's magazines published in the United States
Magazines disestablished in 2022
Online magazines with defunct print editions